In software engineering, behavioral design patterns are design patterns that identify common communication patterns among objects. By doing so, these patterns increase flexibility in carrying out communication.

Design patterns 
Examples of this type of design pattern include:

 Blackboard design pattern: provides a computational framework for the design and implementation of systems that integrate large and diverse specialized modules, and implement complex, non-deterministic control strategies
 Chain of responsibility pattern: Command objects are handled or passed on to other objects by logic-containing processing objects
 Command pattern: Command objects encapsulate an action and its parameters
 "Externalize the stack": Turn a recursive function into an iterative function that uses a stack
 Interpreter pattern: Implement a specialized computer language to rapidly solve a specific set of problems
 Iterator pattern: Iterators are used to access the elements of an aggregate object sequentially without exposing its underlying representation
 Mediator pattern: Provides a unified interface to a set of interfaces in a subsystem
 Memento pattern: Provides the ability to restore an object to its previous state (rollback)
 Null object pattern: Designed to act as a default value of an object
 Observer pattern: a.k.a. Publish/Subscribe or Event Listener. Objects register to observe an event that may be raised by another object
 Weak reference pattern: De-couple an observer from an observable
 Protocol stack: Communications are handled by multiple layers, which form an encapsulation hierarchy
 Scheduled-task pattern: A task is scheduled to be performed at a particular interval or clock time (used in real-time computing)
 Single-serving visitor pattern: Optimise the implementation of a visitor that is allocated, used only once, and then deleted
 Specification pattern: Recombinable business logic in a boolean fashion
 State pattern: A clean way for an object to partially change its type at runtime
 Strategy pattern: Algorithms can be selected on the fly, using composition
 Template method pattern: Describes the skeleton of a program; algorithms can be selected on the fly, using inheritance
 Visitor pattern: A way to separate an algorithm from an object

See also
 Concurrency pattern
 Creational pattern
 Structural pattern

References

Software design patterns